Ewa Air is a French airline with its corporate head office on the property of Dzaoudzi Pamandzi International Airport in Pamandzi, Mayotte, near Dzaoudzi. The airline began operations in 2013.

Corporate affairs
It commenced operations with a capital sum of €4.4 million.

Shareholders

Destinations

Fleet
As of May 2020, Ewa Air operates the following aircraft:

References

External links
 Official website

Airlines of Mayotte
2013 establishments in Mayotte
Airlines established in 2013